Camelback High School is part of the Phoenix Union High School District.  The campus is located at 4612 North 28th Street, northeast of downtown Phoenix, Arizona, United States. Camelback's enrollment is just over 2,000 students, over 75 percent of whom are Hispanic. The school predominantly serves students from partner elementary districts Balsz, Creighton, Madison and Wilson.

History 
Camelback was designed by a group of noted local architects consisting of Lescher & Mahoney, Edward L. Varney, H. H. Green and John Sing Tang with Harold Ekman and Fred M. Guirey as consultant and supervising architects. The construction contract to build the school was awarded to Mardian Construction Co. The campus was renovated in 2007 with many of the outdated original buildings demolished and replaced with new buildings. Architectural Resource Team drew up the planes for the renovation.

Partner elementary districts
 Balsz
 Creighton
 Madison
 Wilson

Notable alumni
 Patrick O. Ford – Vietnam war hero
 Gary Gentry – professional baseball player; pitched for 1969 "Miracle" New York Mets
 Clay Graham – writer, producer, website creator

 Derek Mason – cornerback at Northern Arizona University; former defensive coordinator at Stanford; former head coach at Vanderbilt University; current defensive coordinator at Auburn University.
 Billy Mayfair – professional golfer, ASU
 Warren Wheat – NFL player, Seattle Seahawks 1989 & 1991, BYU
 Kevin Miniefield – NFL player, Chicago Bears and Arizona Cardinals, ASU
 Valerie Perrine – actress, dancer
 Liza Richardson – music supervisor, radio broadaster, DJ, host, producer KCRW 89.9 MHz FM, Santa Monica, California
 Skip Rimsza – former Mayor of Phoenix
 Tom Robson – former MLB player (Texas Rangers)
 Juan Schoville – 2020 Phoenix Mayor Candidate & 2022 Phoenix City Council District 6 candidate 
 John Shadegg – US House of Representatives
 Neal Smith – drummer for band Alice Cooper
 Frank Spotnitz – writer, producer
 Melody Thornton – singer
 Mark Whipple – football coach, University of Massachusetts

Trivia
Camelback High School is referenced in the song "Alma Mater" by Alice Cooper, whose drummer Neal Smith graduated from there.

References

External links
 Camelback High School
 Phoenix Union High School District website
 Arizona Department of Education School Report Card
 Twitter
 Facebook

Public high schools in Arizona
Educational institutions established in 1954
High schools in Phoenix, Arizona
1954 establishments in Arizona